Torsåker can refer to:

 Torsåker, Hofors, Sweden
 Torsåker Parish, Diocese of Härnösand, Kramfors Municipality, Sweden, where the Torsåker witch trials of 1675 took place
 Torsåker Castle, mansion in Uppland, Sweden
 Church village in Gnesta Municipality, Södermanland, Sweden